Life in Stereo may refer to:

Life In Stereo, a blog by Jonathan Leong
Life in Stereo (The Pinker Tones album), 2012
Life in Stereo (Ryan Farish album) 2012